The following lists events that happened in 1982 in Libya.

Incumbents
 Prime Minister: Jadallah Azzuz at-Talhi

Events
 hosting of 1982 African Cup of Nations

 
Years of the 20th century in Libya
Libya
Libya
1980s in Libya